Angel of Rome may refer to:

 Samael, guardian angel of the city of Rome
 Alessandro Moreschi, Italian castrato singer
 Pankratius Pfeiffer, Catholic priest and rescuer of Jews during the Nazi occupation of Rome
 The Angel of Rome, 1992 BBC radio play based on Moreschi's life
 The Angel of Rome: And Other Stories, 2021 short story collection by Jess Walter